Dan McLindon (born 3 March 1940) is a Scottish former football player and manager. McLindon was signed by Dunfermline, then managed by Jock Stein, from junior club Bellshill in 1960. McLindon was part of the Dunfermline team that won the 1961 Scottish Cup Final. He moved to St Johnstone in 1964, in exchange for Alex Ferguson. Later that year he was again exchanged, to Partick Thistle, for Neil Duffy. Thistle were relegated in 1970, after which McLindon left the club.

McLindon then became player/manager of Stranraer for a year. McLindon then moved to East Stirlingshire as a player. McLindon then became a coach and manager, working for Alloa, Cowdenbeath, East Stirlingshire, Airdrie, Motherwell and Partick Thistle.

References

1940 births
Living people
Scottish footballers
Scottish football managers
Association football inside forwards
Bellshill Athletic F.C. players
Dunfermline Athletic F.C. players
St Johnstone F.C. players
Partick Thistle F.C. players
Stranraer F.C. players
Stranraer F.C. managers
East Stirlingshire F.C. players
Alloa Athletic F.C. managers
Cowdenbeath F.C. managers
East Stirlingshire F.C. managers
Motherwell F.C. non-playing staff
Scottish Football League managers
Scottish Football League players